Spirit Mountain Casino may refer to:

 Spirit Mountain Casino (Arizona), a casino in the United States
 Spirit Mountain Casino (Oregon), United States